General Schwartz may refer to:

Mark C. Schwartz (fl. 1980s–2020s), U.S. Army lieutenant general
Norton A. Schwartz (born 1951), U.S. Air Force four-star general
Thomas A. Schwartz (born 1945), U.S. Army four-star general